O'Dell is an English surname originating from the village Odell in Bedfordshire, England. Folk etymology gave it a misleading Irish O'Dell spelling. Some families anglicized their name over time.

Notable people with the surname include (in alphabetical order):

 Billy O'Dell (1933–2018), American baseball player
 Cricket O'Dell, fictional character from Archie Comics
 Diane O'Dell (born 1953), American serial killer
 Jack O'Dell (1923–2019), American civil rights activist
 Kenny O'Dell (1944–2018), American country music singer and songwriter
 Nancy O'Dell (born 1966), American television host and entertainment journalist
 Patrick O'Dell (born 1938), American award-winning cinematographer for CBS News
 Rick O'Dell (born 1948), American racing driver
 Scott O'Dell (1898–1989), American children's author
 Tom O'Dell (born 1990), American television host
 Tony O'Dell (born 1960), American actor
 Walden O'Dell (active since 2003), American businessman

See also
 Odell (surname)
 Odell (given name)
 Dell (name), given name and surname

Surnames
English-language surnames
Surnames of English origin
Surnames of British Isles origin
Surnames of Irish origin